Pultenaea altissima, commonly known as tall bush-pea, is a species of flowering plant in the family Fabaceae and is endemic to south-eastern continental Australia. It is an erect shrub with spatula-shaped to egg-shaped leaves and yellow flowers in clusters at the ends of branches.

Description

Taxonomy and naming
Pultenaea altissima was first formally described in 1864 by George Bentham in Flora Australiensis from an unpublished description by Ferdinand von Mueller. The specific epithet (altissima) means "very tall".

Distribution and habitat
This pultenaea grows in heath and woodland, often near swamps or watercourse, on the tablelands of New South Wales, south-eastern Queensland and the far north-east of Victoria.

References

altissima
Flora of Queensland
Flora of Victoria (Australia)
Flora of New South Wales
Taxa named by George Bentham
Plants described in 1864